Winfried Georg Sebald (18 May 1944 – 14 December 2001), known as W. G. Sebald or (as he preferred) Max Sebald, was a German writer and academic. At the time of his death at the age of 57, he was being cited by literary critics as one of the greatest living authors.

Life
Sebald was born in Wertach, Bavaria, second of the three children of Rosa and Georg Sebald, and his parents' only son.   From 1948 to 1963, he lived in Sonthofen. His father joined the Reichswehr in 1929 and remained in the Wehrmacht under the Nazis. His father remained a detached figure, a prisoner of war until 1947; his maternal grandfather, the small-town police officer Josef Egelhofer (1872–1956), was the most important male presence during his early years. Sebald was shown images of The Holocaust while at school in Oberstdorf and recalled that no one knew how to explain what they had just seen. The Holocaust and post-war Germany are central themes in his work.

Sebald studied German and English literature first at the University of Freiburg and then at the University of Fribourg in Switzerland, where he received a degree in 1965. He was a Lector at the University of Manchester from 1966 to 1969. He returned to St. Gallen in Switzerland for a year hoping to work as a teacher but could not settle. Sebald married his Austrian-born wife, Ute, in 1967. In 1970 he became a lecturer at the University of East Anglia (UEA). There, he completed his PhD in 1973 with a dissertation entitled The Revival of Myth: A Study of Alfred Döblin's Novels. Sebald acquired habilitation from the University of Hamburg in 1986. In 1987, he was appointed to a chair of European literature at UEA. In 1989 he became the founding director of the British Centre for Literary Translation. He lived at Wymondham and Poringland while at UEA.

Final year

The 2001 publication of Austerlitz (both in German and English) secured Sebald worldwide fame: "Austerlitz was received enthusiastically on an international scale; literary critics celebrated it frenetically; the book established Sebald as a modern classic." He was tipped as a possible future winner of the Nobel Prize in Literature. With grown and still growing reputation, he was now in high demand by literary institutions and radio programmes throughout Western Europe. Newspapers, magazines and journals from Germany, Austria, Belgium, the Netherlands, Britain and the U.S. urged him for interviews. "Condemned to unrest I am, I am afraid", he wrote to Andreas Dorschel in June 2001, returning from one trip and setting out for the next.

Sebald died while driving near Norwich in December 2001. The event threw the literary public into a state of shock. Sebald had been driving with his daughter Anna, who survived the crash. The coroner's report, released some six months after the accident, stated that Sebald had suffered a heart attack and had died of this condition before his car swerved across the road and collided with an oncoming lorry.

W.G. Sebald is buried in St. Andrew's churchyard in Framingham Earl, close to where he lived.

Themes and style
Sebald's works are largely concerned with the themes of memory and loss of memory (both personal and collective) and decay (of civilizations, traditions or physical objects). They are, in particular, attempts to reconcile himself with, and deal in literary terms with, the trauma of the Second World War and its effect on the German people. In On the Natural History of Destruction (1999), he wrote an essay on the wartime bombing of German cities and the absence in German writing of any real response. His concern with The Holocaust is expressed in several books delicately tracing his own biographical connections with Jews.

His distinctive and innovative novels were written in an intentionally somewhat old-fashioned and elaborate German (one passage in Austerlitz famously contains a sentence that is 9 pages long). Sebald closely supervised the English translations (principally by Anthea Bell and Michael Hulse). They include Vertigo, The Emigrants, The Rings of Saturn and Austerlitz. They are notable for their curious and wide-ranging mixture of fact (or apparent fact), recollection and fiction, often punctuated by indistinct black-and-white photographs set in evocative counterpoint to the narrative rather than illustrating it directly. His novels are presented as observations and recollections made while travelling around Europe. They also have a dry and mischievous sense of humour.

Sebald was also the author of three books of poetry: For Years Now with Tess Jaray (2001), After Nature (1988), and Unrecounted (2004).

Works

 1988 After Nature. London: Hamish Hamilton. (Nach der Natur. Ein Elementargedicht) English ed. 2002
 1990 Vertigo. London: Harvill. (Schwindel. Gefühle) English ed. 1999
 1992 The Emigrants. London: Harvill. (Die Ausgewanderten. Vier lange Erzählungen) English ed. 1996
 1995 The Rings of Saturn. London: Harvill. (Die Ringe des Saturn. Eine englische Wallfahrt) English ed. 1998
 1998 A Place in the Country. (Logis in einem Landhaus) English ed. 2013
 1999 On the Natural History of Destruction. London: Hamish Hamilton. (Luftkrieg und Literatur: Mit einem Essay zu Alfred Andersch) English ed. 2003
 2001 Austerlitz. London: Hamish Hamilton. (Austerlitz) English ed. 2001
 2001 For Years Now. London: Short Books.
 2003 Unrecounted London: Hamish Hamilton. (Unerzählt, 33 Texte) English ed. 2004
 2003 Campo Santo London: Hamish Hamilton. (Campo Santo, Prosa, Essays) English ed. 2005
 2008 Across the Land and the Water: Selected Poems, 1964–2001. (Über das Land und das Wasser. Ausgewählte Gedichte 1964–2001.) English ed. 2012

Influences
The works of Jorge Luis Borges, especially "The Garden of Forking Paths" and "Tlön, Uqbar, Orbis Tertius", were a major influence on Sebald. (Tlön and Uqbar appear in The Rings of Saturn.) Sebald himself credited the Austrian novelist Thomas Bernhard as a major influence on his work, and paid homage within his work to Kafka and Nabokov (the figure of Nabokov appears in every one of the four sections of The Emigrants).

Memorials

Sebaldweg ("Sebald Way") 
As a memorial to the writer, in 2005 the town of Wertach created an eleven kilometre long walkway called the  It runs from the border post at Oberjoch (1,159m) to W. G. Sebald's birthplace on Grüntenseestrasse 3 in Wertach (915m). The route is that taken by the narrator in Il ritorno in patria, the final section of Vertigo ("Schwindel. Gefühle") by W. G. Sebald. Six steles have been erected along the way with texts from the book relating to the respective topographical place.

Sebald Copse 
In the grounds of the University of East Anglia in Norwich a round wooden bench encircles a copper beech tree, planted in 2003 by the family of W. G. Sebald in memory of the writer. Together with other trees donated by former students of the writer, the area is called the "Sebald Copse". The bench, whose form echoes The Rings of Saturn, carries an inscription from the penultimate poem of Unerzählt ("Unrecounted"): "Unerzählt bleibt die Geschichte der abgewandten Gesichter" ("Unrecounted always it will remain the story of the averted faces")

Patience (After Sebald) 

In 2011, Grant Gee made the documentary Patience (After Sebald) about the author's trek through the East Anglian landscape.

References

Citations

General and cited sources 
 Arnold, Heinz Ludwig (ed.). W. G. Sebald. Munich, 2003 (Text+Kritik. Zeitschrift für Literatur. IV, 158). Includes bibliography.
 Bewes, Timothy. "What is a Literary Landscape? Immanence and the Ethics of Form". differences, vol. 16, no. 1 (Spring 2005), 63–102. Discusses the relation to landscape in the work of Sebald and Flannery O'Connor.
 Bigsby, Christopher. Remembering and Imagining the Holocaust: The Chain of Memory. Cambridge, Cambridge University Press, 2006.
 Blackler, Deane. Reading W. G. Sebald: Adventure and Disobedience. Camden House, 2007.
 Breuer, Theo, "Einer der Besten. W. G. Sebald (1944–2001)" in T.B., Kiesel & Kastanie. Von neuen Gedichten und Geschichten, Edition YE 2008.
 Denham, Scott and Mark McCulloh (eds.). W. G. Sebald: History, Memory, Trauma. Berlin, Walter de Gruyter, 2005.
 Grumley, John, "Dialogue with the Dead: Sebald, Creatureliness, and the Philosophy of Mere Life", The European Legacy, 16,4 (2011), 505–518.
 Jacobs, Carol. Sebald's Vision. New York: Columbia University Press, 2017.
 Long, J. J. W. G. Sebald: Image, Archive, Modernity. New York, Columbia University Press, 2008.
 Long, J. J. and Anne Whitehead (eds.). W. G. Sebald: A Critical Companion. Edinburgh, Edinburgh University Press, 2006.
 McCulloh, Mark R. Understanding W. G. Sebald. University of South Carolina Press, 2003.
 Patt, Lise et al. (eds.). Searching for Sebald: Photography after W. G. Sebald. ICI Press, 2007. An anthology of essays on Sebald's use of images, with artist's projects inspired by Sebald.
 Wylie, John. "The Spectral Geographies of W. G. Sebald". Cultural Geographies, 14,2 (2007), 171–188.
 Zaslove, Jerry. "W. G. Sebald and Exilic Memory: His Photographic Images of the Cosmogony of Exile and Restitution". Journal of the Interdisciplinary Crossroads, Vol. 3 (No. 1) (April 2006).

External links

 Complete bibliography of Sebald's works
 An essay by Ben Lerner on Sebald in The New York Review of Books
  The last interview
 
 Audio interview with Sebald on KCRW's Bookworm
 Sebald-Forum
 BBC Radio4 Program: "A German Genius in Britain"

1944 births
2001 deaths
20th-century German male writers
20th-century German novelists
20th-century German poets
Academics of the University of East Anglia
Alumni of the University of East Anglia
German emigrants to England
German male novelists
German male poets
People from Oberallgäu
Road incident deaths in England
University of Fribourg alumni
Academic staff of the University of Hamburg